Dreamloop Games Ltd., known as Dreamloop, is a Finnish video game developer based in Tampere, Finland. The company was founded in August 2014 by current chief executive officer Joni Lappalainen, current chief technical officer Hannes Väisänen, and current chief marketing officer/creative director Steve Stewart. All three founders previously worked together at Fragment Production, where Stewart served as Marketing Director. Dreamloop currently employs 8 people, and is led by its co-founders. In late 2015 Dreamloop began actively campaigning to reform Finnish laws surrounding Crowdfunding. In 2015 Dreamloop launched a Kickstarter campaign to finance production of their upcoming game Challengers of Khalea, but funding was unsuccessful.

Games
In November 2015, Dreamloop released the arcade shooter Stardust Galaxy Warriors for PC. The game features 1-4 player local co-op multiplayer, and has been received well by both critics and the Steam community. In April 2016, in an interview on PopGeeks.net, Dreamloop Games announced that it would bring Stardust Galaxy Warriors to consoles. Stardust Galaxy Warriors currently maintains a 93% positive rating on Steam.

Dreamloop is currently in production of the tactical role playing game Challengers of Khalea. Initially imagined as a combination of multiplayer online battle arena and turn-based tactics genres, a change of direction in early 2016 led the title to transform into a tactical turn-based role playing game, heavily inspired by the Fire Emblem and Final Fantasy Tactics titles. The visuals were heavily inspired by both comic book art and Art Nouveau, in order to create an entirely unique 2D representation for storytelling, akin to various Japanese role-playing game titles. Challengers of Khalea is expected to be released in November 2016.

References

External links
 

Companies based in Tampere
Video game development companies
Video game companies established in 2014
Finnish companies established in 2014
Video game companies of Finland